Jake Antony Kirby (born 9 May 1994) is an English former professional footballer who played as a midfielder.

Career
Kirby came through Tranmere Rovers's youth system and was awarded his first professional one-year contract by the club in April 2012.

He made his Football League debut against Scunthorpe United on 5 May 2012 as a substitute for Jake Cassidy, playing the last 15 minutes of the match. He made six more appearances in the first half of the next season before being offered a new two and a half year contract.

The next season Kirby became regular first-team player, making 35 appearances and scoring two first senior goals against Coventry City, one away and one at home as Tranmere finished 21st in the division and relegated to the League Two.

One year until contract expire, Kirby extended it till summer 2017 on 26 May 2014. The 2014/15 campaign saw Rovers relegated from Football League, while Kirby made 20 appearances and scored a goal - winning one against Northampton Town.

On 28 August 2015 Kirby was loaned to the National League North side Stockport County, where he reunited with former teammates Kayode Odejayi, Andy Robinson and Abdulai Bell-Baggie. Following day he made his County debut as a substitute. On 31 September, Stockport beat AFC Fylde 3-2 after Kirby scored the winning goal in the fifth minute of stoppage time. Initial one-month loan was later extended to three months. On 26 November he was recalled to the parent club. He was released by Tranmere at the end of the 2017–18 season and went to Stockport County for a second spell in that summer.

He retired in September 2019.

Playing style
He can play in five positions: central midfield, right midfield, left midfield, behind the striker and as a striker.

Statistics

References

External links

Living people
English footballers
Association football midfielders
Tranmere Rovers F.C. players
English Football League players
Footballers from Liverpool
1994 births
Stockport County F.C. players